USS Arkansas (SSN-800) is a  nuclear powered attack submarine currently being built for the United States Navy. She is the twenty-seventh boat of the class and the fifth vessel to be named for the U.S. state of Arkansas. She was ordered on 28 April 2014, and named during a ceremony on 15 June 2016 by Secretary of the Navy Ray Mabus. Arkansas was keel laid on 19 November 2022 at Newport News Shipbuilding.

In popular culture
Arkansas was featured in the 2018 film Hunter Killer, which was based on the novel Firing Point by George Wallace and Don Keith.

References

 

Virginia-class submarines